The Ashton Historic District is a historic district in Cumberland, Rhode Island. The district consists of a mill and an adjacent mill village that was built for the workers of the mill. It lies between Mendon Road, Scott Road, Angell Road, Store Hill Road, Front Street and Middle Street.  The district was added to the National Register of Historic Places on November 1, 1984.

In 1867, in a program of further expansion, the Lonsdale Company erected a large, three and-one-half-story, mansard-roof brick mill at Ashton on the east side of the Blackstone River north of Lonsdale. It was later enlarged to four full stories with a flat roof.

A compact group of associated brick row houses and other buildings, including a handsome mansard-roofed office, also were built. This mill played a major role in 19th-century textile technology and was the site of the first large-scale test of the high-speed Sawyer spindle, one of the earliest of its type developed in the United States. The mill houses here are noteworthy for their simple form and dense arrangement. The village is tucked into a narrow, low flood plain site at the bottom of a bluff carrying Mendon Road (Rhode Island Route 122) in this section.

See also
Old Ashton Historic District, across the river in Lincoln
National Register of Historic Places listings in Providence County, Rhode Island

References

Cumberland, Rhode Island
Historic districts in Providence County, Rhode Island
Historic districts on the National Register of Historic Places in Rhode Island
National Register of Historic Places in Providence County, Rhode Island
Blackstone River Valley National Historical Park